Ernest Renshaw defeated Richard Richardson 6–5, 6–3, 2–6, 6–3 in the All Comers' Final, but the reigning champion William Renshaw defeated Ernest Renshaw 6–1, 2–6, 4–6, 6–2, 6–2 in the challenge round to win the gentlemen's singles tennis title at the 1882 Wimbledon Championships.

Draw

Challenge round

All comers' finals

Top half

Bottom half

References

External links

Singles
Wimbledon Championship by year – Men's singles